Chullpa Ch'utu (Quechua chullpa stone tomb, burial tower, ch'utu cone, "chullpa cone", also spelled Chullpa Chutu) is a  mountain in the Bolivian Andes. It is located in the Cochabamba Department, Arani Province, Vacas Municipality, north of Vacas. The Jatun Mayu ("big river"), a tributary of Parqu Qucha, flows along its western slope.

References 

Mountains of Cochabamba Department